The Carlos Palanca Memorial Awards for Literature winners in the year 1992 (rank, title of winning entry, name of author).


English division
Short story
First prize: “The Trouble in Beijing” by Charlson Ong
Second prize: “On Cursed Ground” by Vicente Groyon III
Third prize: “Cogon” by Edgardo B. Maranan

Short story for children
First prize: ”Lost” by Amado Lacuesta Jr.
Second prize: “Chun” by Marivi Soliven
Third prize: “The Zimbragatzes of the Planet Zing” by Rene O. Villanueva

Poetry
First prize: “Dream of the Blue Gypsy” by Merlie Alunan
Second prize: “Crossing the Snow Bridge” by Ma. Fatima V. Lim
Third prize: “Santa Claus and Venus at the Mall” by Fidelito Cortes

Essay
First prize: “Island and Hinterland” by Edgardo B. Maranan
Second prize: “The Press: Nobody's Perfect” by Claudio Leones
Third prize: “An Old Fashioned Woman” by Cristina Pantoja-Hidalgo

One-act play
First prize: No winner
Second prize: No winner
Third prize: “Blind Alleys” by Crispin Ramos Jr.
Special Mention: “She Devil” by Rene O. Villanueva

Full-length play
First prize: No winner
Second prize: No winner
Third prize: No winner
Special Mention: “The Jagged Edge of Being” by Rainerio George Ramos

Filipino division
Short story
First prize: “Gaya ng Dati” by Henry Nadong
Second prize: “Si Regina at Ako” by Evelyn Estrella-Sebastian
Third prize: “Ang Mga Martir” by Ariel Valerio

Short story for children
First prize: “Nemo, Ang Batang Papel” by Rene O. Villanueva
Second prize: “Alakdan” by Luna Sicat-Cleto
Third prize: “Meek... Meeek...” by Jose A. Bragado

Poetry
First prize: “Bestiyaryo at iba pang Prosang Itim” by Mike L. Bigornia
Second prize: "Labinglima Lamang" by Victor Emmanuel Nadera Jr.
Third prize: “Makiling Suite at iba pang Tula” by Romulo P. Baquiran Jr.; and “Sa Pagbabalangkas ng mga Gunita” by Ma. Jovita Zarate

Essay
First prize: “How I Spent My Summer Vacation O Kung Papaano Ko Ipaliliwanag” by Reuel Molina Aguila
Second prize: “Sa Panahon ng Pagpapaliban at Pagpipinid” by Eli Rueda Guieb III
Third prize: “Kumpisal ng Isang Nag-aatubiling Mag-sulat” by Cesar Aljama

One-act play
First prize: “Daigdig Dinaig ng Makamundong Pananalig” by Abel Molina; and “Dalawang Mukha ng Kagubatan” by Emelita Regis
Second prize: “Isang Dulang Romantiko sa Modernong Panahon” by Mars D. Cavestany Jr.; and “Juan Bautista” ni Lakangiting Garcia
Third prize: “Churchill” by Rodolfo R. Lana Jr.; and “I.C.U.” by Ramon C. Jocson

Full-length play
First prize: “Damas de Noche” by Josephine Barrios
Second prize: “Kung Paano Ko Pinatay si Diana Ross” by Rodolfo C. Vera
Third prize: “Jerry at Richie Twin Peaks” by Rolando S. Salvana; and “Kapitan Popong: Ang Pakikipagsapalaran ng Isang Batang Bayani” by Rodolfo C. Vera

Teleplay
First prize: “After Long Silence” by Elsa Martinez Coscolluela; and “Walang Lunas” by Ronaldo C. Tumbokon
Second prize: “One More Chance” by Rene O. Villanueva
Third prize: “A Tree to Cut Down” by Rolando S. Salvana; and “Edukasyong Kalye” by Rolando F. Santos

References
 

Palanca Awards
Palanca Awards, 1992